Canadian singer-songwriter Avril Lavigne has released seven studio albums, nine extended plays (EPs), 33 singles, and 40 music videos, and she has appeared on several movie soundtracks and charity albums. With worldwide sales of 40 million albums and 50 million singles, Lavigne is ranked as the third top-selling Canadian female artist in history. Billboard listed her as the eighth best-selling Canadian artists of the Nielsen Music Canada era. According to Recording Industry Association of America, Lavigne has sold 28.07 million albums and singles in the United States.

Lavigne's debut studio album Let Go was released in June 2002 and peaked at number two on the US Billboard 200 in the United States. It has sold over 16 million copies worldwide and is certified seven-times platinum in the United States. The album's lead single, "Complicated", peaked at number one in Australia and Canada and at number two in the United States, and it sold 3 million units in the US. Its subsequent single releases, "Sk8er Boi" and "I'm with You", became worldwide top ten hits. Lavigne released her second studio album Under My Skin in May 2004, and debuted at number one in Australia, Mexico, Canada, Japan, the United Kingdom and the United States. The album went on to sell more than 10 million copies worldwide. "My Happy Ending", the second and most successful single from the album, peaked at number nine on the US Billboard Hot 100 and sold 1.2 million copies in the United States.

In April 2007, her third studio album, The Best Damn Thing, was released. It was her second album to debut at number one on the US Billboard 200 chart, it sold 6 million copies worldwide, and has produced Lavigne's most successful single, "Girlfriend". The song became her first number one hit on the US Billboard Hot 100 chart, and subsequently became her best-selling single in that region with 3.8 million copies sold. The song also peaked at number one on the other record charts of several nations, including Canada, Australia, New Zealand and Europe. "Girlfriend" became a worldwide best-selling single, with 7.5 million copies sold. The album's second single, "When You're Gone", was a top-forty hit in the United States, and it reached the top ten in Australia, Canada, Sweden, and the United Kingdom. In March 2011, Lavigne released her fourth studio album, Goodbye Lullaby, it had sold 1.5 million copies worldwide. It was preceded by its lead single, "What the Hell", which peaked at number 11 on the US Billboard Hot 100 chart and has sold 2.1 million copies in the United States. The album's second single, "Smile", was released in May 2011, and its third, "Wish You Were Here", was released later in September. In November 2013, Lavigne released her fifth studio album, Avril Lavigne. Its lead single, "Here's to Never Growing Up", had moderate success peaking inside the top 20 in Australia, Canada, Ireland, the United Kingdom, and the United States, selling 1.3 million copies in the United States. The album spawned four more singles: "Rock n Roll", "Let Me Go", "Hello Kitty" and "Give You What You Like". In February 2019, Lavigne released her sixth studio album Head Above Water and debuted at number 13 on the US Billboard 200, and number five on the Canadian Albums, and number 10 on the UK Albums (OCC). The lead single of the album, also titled "Head Above Water", was released in September 2018, and peaked at number 64 on the US Billboard Hot 100 and number 37 on the Canadian Hot 100 and certified RIAA Platinum with 1 million units sold in the United States. The album spawned three more singles: "Tell Me It's Over", "Dumb Blonde", and "I Fell in Love with the Devil".

In February 2022, Lavigne released her seventh studio album Love Sux, the album debuted at number nine on the US Billboard 200 chart, In other countries it debuted at number three in Australia, Austria, Canada, and in the UK. Overall, Love Sux debuted on the top ten in eleven countries. The album's lead single "Bite Me", was released in November 2021, it had moderate success debuting at number 63 in Canada, and 61 in the UK, and number 20 on the US Billboard Bubbling Under Hot 100 Singles chart, the song was certified Gold in Brazil and Canada. The album's second single "Love It When You Hate Me" featuring American singer Blackbear was released in January 2022, it debuted at number 76 in Canada, and it charted moderately on the US component charts, and made an impact on US radios. The third single, "Bois Lie" featuring American singer Machine Gun Kelly was released in September 2022, And It debuted at number 85 in Canada, the song charted moderately on the component charts in the US.

Lavigne has written songs for several film soundtracks, including those of American Wedding and Sweet Home Alabama. Two songs that she originally wrote for films were included on subsequent studio albums. "Keep Holding On", written for Eragon, appeared on The Best Damn Thing, and "Alice", written for Alice in Wonderland, appeared on Goodbye Lullaby. She also has 15 VEVO-certified videos, including "Girlfriend", "Smile", "Complicated", and "Hot".

Albums

Studio albums

Live albums

Compilation albums

Extended plays

Singles

As lead artist

As featured artist

Promotional singles

Charity singles

Other charted songs

Videography

Video albums

Music videos

See also
List of songs performed by Avril Lavigne
List of best-selling female music artists
List of best-selling albums by women

Footnotes

References

External links
 Avril Lavigne's official website

Discography
Discographies of Canadian artists
Pop music discographies
Alternative rock discographies
Rock music discographies